Maqsood Saqib (born 4 April 1955) is a Pakistani Punjabi writer, editor and publisher. He published a magazine named "Maan Boli" from 1986 until 1997 and now he has been publishing the monthly magazine under the name "Pancham" from 1998. He received Bhai Vir Singh award for publishing the best magazine in both the East and the West Punjab. He runs a publishing house named Suchet Kitab Ghar with his wife Faiza Raʼana.

Biography

Early life
Saqib was born in Shekhupura, Punjab, Pakistan in a family with an agricultural background.

Works

Collections of stories
 KahaniyaaN (1986)
 Sucha Tilla tay Hor KahaniyaaN (1995)

Edited
 Abyat of Hazrat Sultan Bahu (2004)
 Oxford Picture Dictionary English-Punjabi (2014)
 Hymns of Baba Farid Shakar Ganj
 Hymns of Baba Nanak (2005)
 Sangeet Karan Dian Gallan
 Lok Boli Lok Vihar (2013)

Translations
 Pankh Mukt (2002)

Awards
 Bhai Vir Singh Award (1990)

References

1955 births
Pakistani writers
Living people